Saint-Adrien is a municipality located in the Estrie region of Quebec, Canada.

References

External links

Municipalities in Quebec
Incorporated places in Estrie
Canada geography articles needing translation from French Wikipedia